Cape Gates is an ice-covered cape which marks the northwestern extremity of Carney Island along the coast of Marie Byrd Land, Antarctica. It was first mapped by United States Geological Survey from aerial photographs taken by U.S. Navy Operation Highjump in January 1947, and was named by the Advisory Committee on Antarctic Names for Thomas S. Gates, Under Secretary of the Navy before and during the Navy's Operation Deep Freeze expeditions.

References

Headlands of Marie Byrd Land